This is a list of commanders of the 4th Infantry Division of the United States Army.

Past commanders
MG George H. Cameron 3 December 1917 – 16 August 1918
BG Benjamin A. Poore 16 August 1918 – 27 August 1918
MG John L. Hines 27 August 1918 – 11 October 1918
MG George H. Cameron 11 October 1918 – 22 October 1918
BG Benjamin A. Poore 22 October 1918 – 31 October 1918
MG Mark L. Hersey 31 October 1918 – 1 August 1919
BG Walter E. Prosser 16 June 1940 – 9 December 1940
MG Lloyd R. Fredendall 9 October 1940 – 18 August 1941
MG Oscar W. Griswold 18 August 1941 – 7 October 1941
MG Fred C. Wallace 7 October 1941 – 30 June 1942
MG Terry de la Mesa Allen December 1941 – December 1941
MG Raymond O. Barton 3 July 1942 – 26 December 1944
BG Harold W. Blakeley 18 September 1944 – 20 September 1945
MG Harold R. Bull 20 September 1944 – 29 September 1944
BG James A. Van Fleet 29 September 1944 – 4 October 1944
MG Harold W. Blakeley 27 December 1944 – October 1945
MG George Price Hays November 1945 – March 1946
MG Jens A. Doe 15 July 1947 – 28 February 1949
MG Robert T. Frederick 28 February 1949 – 10 October 1950
MG Harlan N. Hartness 10 October 1950 – 5 April 1953
MG Joseph H. Harper 6 April 1953 – 13 May 1955
MG Clyde D. Eddleman 13 May 1954 – 24 May 1955
MG Rinaldo Van Brunt 24 May 1955 – 15 May 1956
MG Paul L. Freeman 15 September 1956 – 20 January 1957
MG William W. Quinn 20 January 1957 – May 1958
MG John H. McGee June 1958 – August 1958
MG Louis W. Truman August 1958 – June 1960
MG William F. Train July 1960 – April 1962
MG Frederick R. Zierath April 1962 – August 1963
MG Claire E. Hutchin Jr. September 1963 – June 1965
MG Arthur S. Collins Jr. June 1965 – January 1967
MG William R. Peers January 1967 – January 1968
MG Charles P. Stone January 1968 – November 1968
BG Donn R. Pepke November 1968 – November 1969
MG Glenn D. Walker November 1969 – June 1970
MG William A. Burke June 1970 – 9 December 1970
MG John C. Bennett 10 December 1970 – 24 August 1972
MG James F. Hamlet 25 August 1972 – 14 October 1974
MG John W. Vessey Jr. 15 October 1974 – 1 August 1975
MG Williams W. Palmer 2 August 1975 – 15 October 1976
MG John F. Forrest 16 October 1976 – 18 September 1978
MG Louis C. Menetrey 19 September 1978 – 11 September 1980
MG John W. Hudachek 12 September 1980 – 30 July 1982
MG T. G. Jenes Jr. 6 June 1988 – 24 May 1990
MG G. T. Bartlett 14 April 1984 – 6 June 1986
MG James R. Hall 6 June 1986 – 22 June 1988
MG Dennis J. Reimer 22 June 1988 – 25 May 1990
MG Neal T. Jaco 25 May 1990 – 4 October 1991
MG Guy A. J. LaBoa 4 October 1991 – 22 October 1993
MG Thomas A. Schwartz 22 October 1993 – 29 November 1995
MG Robert S. Coffey May 1994 – June 1996
MG Paul J. Kern June 1996 – June 1997
MG William S. Wallace June 1997 – 29 June 1999
MG Benjamin S. Griffin 29 June 1999 – 24 October 2001
MG Raymond T. Odierno 24 October 2001 – 18 June 2004
MG James D. Thurman 18 June 2004 – 19 January 2007
MG Jeffery Hammond 19 January 2007 – 16 July 2009
MG David G. Perkins 16 July 2009 – 16 November 2011
MG Joseph Anderson 16 November 2011 – 14 March 2013
MG Paul LaCamera 14 March 2013  – 14 May 2015
MG Ryan F. Gonsalves 14 May 2015 – 24 August 2017
MG Randy A. George 24 August 2017 – 4 October 2019
MG Matthew W. McFarlane 4 October 2019 – 19 August 2021
MG David M. Hodne 19 August 2021 – present

References 

Lists of United States military unit commanders
United States Army officers
Infantry divisions of the United States Army